Mavi Boncuk may refer to:

 "Mavi Boncuk", Turkish version of the song "Sana gurban"
 Mavi Boncuk or The Blue Bead, a Turkish comedy film